Channel Point Coastal Reserve is a protected area in the Northern Territory of Australia.

The reserve overlaps with the Anson Bay, Daly and Reynolds River Floodplains, an Important Bird and Biodiversity Area.

Facilities in the area include a boat ramp, camping area and a small internal road to the boat ramp. The infrastructure development was commenced in 2006 and completed shortly afterward.

The area contains habitat for many species of birds including royal spoonbills, magpie geese, plumed whistling-duck, grey teal and glossy ibis.

See also
Protected areas of the Northern Territory

References

Coastal reserves in the Northern Territory